Jakub Novák (born 23 March 1988 in Prešov) is a Slovak former professional cyclist.

Major results
2006
 1st  Time trial, National Junior Road Championships
2007
 2nd Time trial, National Under-23 Road Championships
2009
 1st  Time trial, National Under-23 Road Championships
2010
 1st  Road race, National Road Championships

References

External links

1988 births
Living people
Slovak male cyclists
Sportspeople from Prešov